is a former Japanese football player.

Playing career
Yoshinari was born in Tokushima Prefecture on May 19, 1974. After graduating from University of Tsukuba, he joined J1 League club Gamba Osaka in 1997. On July 19, he debuted against JEF United Ichihara in J1 League. However he could only play this match. In 1998, he moved to his local club Otsuka Pharmaceutical. He played many matches as defensive midfielder. In 2003, the club won the champions in Japan Football League. He was also selected MVP award. He retired end of 2003 season.

Club statistics

References

External links

1974 births
Living people
University of Tsukuba alumni
Association football people from Tokushima Prefecture
Japanese footballers
J1 League players
Japan Football League (1992–1998) players
Japan Football League players
Gamba Osaka players
Tokushima Vortis players
Association football midfielders